Princess Shahlyla Ahmadzai Baloch (12 March 1996 – 12 October 2016) was a Pakistani professional footballer who played as a forward for Balochistan United and the Pakistan national women's team. She was granddaughter of Prince Agha Abdul Karim Khan Ahmedzai who was the younger brother of the Khan of Kalat, Mir Ahmedyar Khan.

Biography
Baloch was the first Pakistani woman to score a hat-trick in international club football when she did so during her stint in the Maldives. She represented Pakistan at the 2014 SAFF Women's Championship in Islamabad, which was the last international event that the Pakistan women's team competed in. She made the score sheet in Pakistan's 4–1 victory over Bhutan at that tournament.

She was the daughter of Pakistani women's football President and Senator Rubina Irfan and the sister of Balochistan United and National team manager Raheela Zarmeen. Shahlyla Baloch died in a car accident on 12 October 2016 in Karachi.

In 2018, PFF decided to name the National Women U-16 Football Championship in her honour.

Honours
National Women Football Championship: 2014

References

External links 
 Profile at Pakistan Football Federation (PFF)

1996 births
2016 deaths
Pakistani Muslims
Pakistani women's footballers
Pakistan women's international footballers
Balochistan United W.F.C. players
Footballers from Quetta
Baloch people
Road incident deaths in Pakistan
Women's association football forwards